KBANK, K-Bank or K Bank may refer to: 

 Christiania Bank, a Norwegian bank, also branded as Kreditkassen or K-Bank
 Kasikornbank, a Thai bank (Stock symbol: KBANK)
 K Bank, an internet bank in South Korea which is operated by KT Corporation

See also 
 Jammu & Kashmir Bank, an Indian bank (Stock symbol: J&KBANK)
 K-Rep Bank, a commercial bank in Kenya
 K-CASH, an electronic money system in South Korea